The Venezuela national under-20 football team represents Venezuela in international men's football competitions such as South American Youth Championship. The team became runners-up in the 2017 FIFA U-20 World Cup.

2009 South American Youth Championship

Venezuela was able to qualify for the 2009 FIFA U-20 World Cup after finishing fourth in the hexagonal final, beating teams such as Colombia and Argentina, champions of previous editions of the tournament.

Competitive record

FIFA U-20 World Cup

South American Youth Football Championship

Current status

Recent and forthcoming matches
Matches from the past 12 months as well as any future scheduled matches.

Current squad
The following players were selected for the 2022 Maurice Revello Tournament between 29 May – 12 June 2022.

Stats and goals correct as of 27 May 2022.

Former squads

 2009 FIFA under-20 World Cup squads - Venezuela
 2017 FIFA under-20 World Cup squads - Venezuela

Honours

 FIFA U-20 World Cup:
 Runners-up: 2017
 L'Alcúdia International Football Tournament:
 Runners-up: 2009

See also
 Venezuela national football team
 South American Youth Championship

References

External links

F
South American national under-20 association football teams
Youth sport in Venezuela